Sarki/Mijar is a indigenous people of Nepal  occupational caste traditionally belonging to leather workers. They are found in the region of the Himalayas, Nepal, across the hills of Darjeeling & Kalimpong and in Terai area of Dooars. They are experts in playing their musical instrument "Madal" and performing dance in a group which is also called “Khayali Marooni”. According to the 2011 Nepal census, Sarki makes up 1.4% of Nepal's population (374,816 people). Sarki are referred to in the Nepali and Thakali languages.

Due to many caste-based discriminations in Nepal, the government of Nepal legally abolished the caste-system and criminalized any caste-based discrimination, including "untouchability" (the ostracism of a specific caste) - in the year 1963 A.D. With Nepal's step towards freedom and equality, Nepal, previously ruled by a Hindu monarchy, was a Hindu nation which has now become a secular state, and on 28 May 2008, it was declared a republic, ending it as the Hindu Kingdom

The 1854 Nepalese Muluki Ain (Legal Code) categorized Sarki as a category. Sarki is categorized under "Hill Dalit" among the 9 broad social groups, along with Damai, Badi, Kami and Gaine by the Government of Nepal.

Language 
The Nepali language spoken by Khas Arya is their mother tongue. 
They also speak Gurung 
.

References

Bibliography
 

Himalayan peoples
Ethnic groups in Nepal
Culture of Sikkim
Dalit communities